George W. F. Mulliss House, also known as "Hartwood'" is a historic home located near Martinsburg, Berkeley County, West Virginia. It was built in 1929 and is a large -story, neo-Georgian Revival-style dwelling built of limestone reinforced with steel.  It measures 97 feet wide and 39 feet deep, and consists of a seven bay central block with wings.  Also on the property is a three bay, -story garage.

It was listed on the National Register of Historic Places in 1991.

References 

Houses on the National Register of Historic Places in West Virginia
Georgian Revival architecture in West Virginia
Houses completed in 1929
Houses in Berkeley County, West Virginia
National Register of Historic Places in Martinsburg, West Virginia